Linhpa is a village and village tract in Hkamti Township in Hkamti District in the Sagaing Region of northwestern Burma.  At the time of the 2014 census the village tract had a population of 1371 people of which 763 were men and 608 were women. 248 households were recorded.

References

External links
Maplandia World Gazetteer

Populated places in Hkamti District
Hkamti Township